The BMT Canarsie Line (sometimes referred to as the 14th Street–Eastern Line) is a rapid transit line of the B Division of the New York City Subway system, named after its terminus in the Canarsie neighborhood of Brooklyn.

The line is part of the BMT Eastern Division, and is occasionally referred to as the Eastern District Line. This refers to Williamsburg, which was described as Brooklyn's "Eastern District" when the City of Williamsburg was annexed by the former City of Brooklyn. This was the location where the original Brooklyn subway portions of the line were laid out. Only later was the line connected to the tracks leading to Canarsie. Eastern District High School, near the line's Grand Street station, had preserved this toponym until it was closed in 1996, later reopened as Grand Street Educational Campus.

The Canarsie Line was first a steam railroad, then a Brooklyn Rapid Transit Company (BRT), later Brooklyn–Manhattan Transit Corporation (BMT), elevated line. It was extended into Manhattan via subway in 1924–1928. Since the early 2000s, the line's signal system has been converted to an automated system. The Manhattan section of the line was partially closed during off-peak hours from early 2019 to April 2020 to allow for a renovation of the 14th Street Tunnel, which the line uses to cross the East River.

Extent and service 
Services that use the Canarsie Line are colored . The following service uses all of the Canarsie Line:

The Canarsie Line runs from Eighth Avenue and 14th Street in Manhattan to Rockaway Parkway in Canarsie, Brooklyn. It is double-tracked along its entire length, except for short stretches of layup track in Manhattan and Brooklyn.

The current line is a two-track subway from its Manhattan terminal to Broadway Junction in the East New York section of Brooklyn, with the exception of a short stretch at Wilson Avenue where it is a double-decked structure with the southbound track outdoors directly above the indoor, ground-level northbound track. Although the northbound track appears to be underground, it is in fact outdoors at ground-level for there are no stairs leading from the northbound platform to the station entrance at the dead-end of Wilson Avenue, southeast of Moffat Street. This is due to the line being pressed directly against the New York Connecting Railroad, which is pressed directly against the border of Trinity Cemetery. There are no express tracks on the Canarsie line; thus, all trains run local service throughout their route. However, in the past, express service has been run between Lorimer Street and Myrtle Avenue by skipping stops via the local tracks. This last operated in August 1956.

Just before Broadway Junction, the line emerges onto an elevated structure, passing over the BMT Jamaica Line. Between Broadway Junction and Atlantic Avenue are the Canarsie Line's only track connections to the rest of the system, via flyover ramps connecting the Canarsie line to the Jamaica Line and East New York Yard (and, until 1956, the Fulton Street Elevated). The Canarsie Line used to share the structure at Atlantic Avenue with the connection from the Broadway and Fulton Street elevated lines to the Liberty Avenue Elevated (still extant further east as part of the IND Fulton Street Line).

East of Pitkin Avenue, the Canarsie Line enters the two-track elevated structure on which the line was originally grade-separated in 1906, entering Sutter Avenue station. At the next station, Livonia Avenue, the Livonia Avenue Elevated of the IRT New Lots Line passes overhead, and just beyond this point is a single track connection to the Linden Shops, which is now a track and structures facility. Besides the connection at Broadway Junction, this non-electrified yard connection is the only other connection to the rest of the subway system, as it is indirectly a connection to the New Lots Line. B Division-sized equipment cannot access this line, however, because of A Division width restrictions.

Beyond the next station, New Lots Avenue, the elevated structure ends, and an incline brings the Canarsie down to the original 1865 surface right-of-way, the second-oldest such right-of-way on the New York City Transit Authority system. The line operates on this ground-level route to the end of the line at Rockaway Parkway.

As with other BMT Eastern Division lines, the Canarsie Line can accommodate trains with eight  or eight  cars. Due to the narrow turning radiuses of the lines,  cars (R44, R46, R68, R68A) could not be used on the Eastern Division. Additionally, about half of stations on the Canarsie Line can fit trains with nine 60-foot-long cars, though the front and back ends of the trains would overshoot the platform at many of these stations.

History

Steam and elevated era 

Before becoming a BRT elevated line in 1906, the Canarsie Line operated as a steam dummy line. It was first owned by the Brooklyn and Rockaway Beach Railroad, chartered December 24, 1863, and opened October 21, 1865, from the Long Island Rail Road in East New York to a pier at Canarsie Landing, very close to the current junction of Rockaway Parkway and the Belt Parkway, where ferries continued on to Rockaway. The line was single-tracked until 1894.

The Canarsie Railroad was chartered on May 8, 1906, as a BRT subsidiary (leased to the Brooklyn Union Elevated Railroad) and acquired the line on May 31, 1906. The line was partly elevated, and electrified with third rail on the elevated part and trolley wire on the rest, south of New Lots Avenue. The Long Island Rail Road, which had used the line north of New Lots to access their Bay Ridge Branch, built a new line just to the west. The East New York terminus was extended several blocks along a section of line formerly used for "East New York Loop" service to the Fulton Street Elevated and the Broadway Elevated (now the BMT Jamaica Line), at a point known as Manhattan Junction (now Broadway Junction).

Service first ran on July 28, 1906, from Canarsie Landing to the Broadway Ferry at the foot of Broadway in Williamsburg, at the East River. This route still exists as the BMT Jamaica Line, except for the last piece to the East River, where the Jamaica Line runs over the Williamsburg Bridge. The route was later extended over the bridge and along the BMT Nassau Street Line to Canal Street and then Chambers Street.

Dual Contracts rebuilding 
The Dual Contracts subway expansion scheme was formalized in early 1913, specifying new lines or expansions to be built by the Interborough Rapid Transit Company and the BRT. It saw the rebuilding of the complex train junction at Manhattan Junction into an even more complex flyover junction now known as Broadway Junction. The expansion extended south to the point at which the Canarsie and Fulton Street Elevateds diverged, including a six-track, three-platform station at Atlantic Avenue. The complex was rebuilt under traffic and opened in stages, reaching completion in 1919.

At the same time, the BRT moved to eliminate remaining operations that required elevated trains to operate under overhead wire. In most cases this meant using third rail on fully grade-separated lines. When third rail was extended on the Canarsie Line it was decided to extend this power mode only as far as the important station at Rockaway Parkway and Glenwood Road. Beyond that point, frequent grade crossings made third rail impractical. This portion of the line was converted to the Canarsie Shuttle using elevated cars in October 1917 and converted to trolley cars on October 18, 1920.

One grade crossing was retained at East 105th Street despite the third rail, and was the last public rapid transit grade crossing in New York City. It was closed by 1973 as part of the Flatlands Industrial Park project, which was built on either side of the ground-level Canarsie Line. A pedestrian overpass above the tracks was built to replace the grade crossing.

14th Street–Eastern Line

Initial subway 
The Dual Contracts also called for a subway line initially known as the 14th Street–Eastern District Line, usually shortened to 14th Street–Eastern Line. The line would run beneath 14th Street in Manhattan, from Sixth Avenue under the East River and through Williamsburg to Montrose and Bushwick Avenues in Brooklyn. Booth and Flinn was awarded the contract to construct the line on January 13, 1916. Clifford Milburn Holland served as the engineer-in-charge during the construction. A groundbreaking ceremony was held on April 8, 1916.

The line's opening was delayed by several years. In 1922, John Francis Hylan blocked some construction contracts, claiming that the costs were excessively high. The Station Finish Corporation was contracted to build the stations in Brooklyn and the Charles H. Brown & Son Corporation was contracted to build the stations in Manhattan. Track-laying in the tunnels between Sixth and Montrose Avenues started by November 1922.

Due to the city's failure to approve the section of the line between Montrose Avenue and East New York, the 14th Street/Eastern Line was initially isolated from the rest of the system. In 1924, a temporary connection was built from the Long Island Rail Road (LIRR)'s Bushwick Yard that ran via Montrose Avenue and then connected to the 14th Street/Eastern Line under Bushwick Avenue just near the Montrose Avenue station. This was done to allow the delivery of BMT Standard subway cars. The first of the cars were delivered by this ramp on June 20, 1924. On June 30, 1924, the section between Sixth Avenue in Manhattan and Montrose Avenue in Brooklyn opened. The terminal in Brooklyn was close to the Bushwick station of the Long Island Rail Road's Bushwick Branch. Initial service was provided by three-car trains running every seven and a half minutes. The line collected 9,196 fares in its first day of operation, which constituted its entire ridership for the fiscal year ending June 30, 1924. Ridership rose from 15 million in fiscal 1925 to 23 million in fiscal 1928.

Extensions 
For the extension of the 14th Street/Eastern Line from Montrose Avenue to East New York, the New York City Board of Estimate had initially given its consent to an elevated line over the Evergreen Branch of the LIRR. The Board of Estimate subsequently refused to allow a construction contract for the elevated line, while the BRT did not want to build an underground line. The extension was changed to an underground alignment following opposition from industries on the Evergreen Branch. In July 1924, the New York City Board of Transportation (BOT) approved a modified route for recommendation to the Board of Estimate. The route would be wholly underground and consist of three tracks. From Montrose Avenue, it would curve east under McKibbin Street, private property, and Harrison Place. Past Varick Avenue, it would turn southeast to Wyckoff Avenue, underneath which it would run to Eldert Street. This plan was to cost $8 million.

In September 1924, the BOT approved the remaining section of the route between Eldert Street and Broadway Junction in East New York. East of Eldert Street, the route would turn south to a ground-level alignment parallel to the LIRR's Bay Ridge Branch, then run southeast in a tunnel underneath private property to the intersection of Eastern Parkway and Bushwick Avenue, where it would emerge onto a ramp leading to the existing Canarsie elevated. An ornamental viaduct over Bushwick Avenue and Eastern Parkway was removed from the original plans due to opposition from property owners who called it a "Chinese wall". The BOT also dropped a plan to have a connection from the new subway extension to the Jamaica Line to and from 168th Street, since adding such a connection would slow the movement of trains. This route was adopted by the Board of Estimate the following month. Three contracts for the construction of the extension were awarded in December at a total cost of $9,531,204. The section from Montrose Avenue to Varick Avenue was awarded to the Underpinning and Foundation Company, while the section from Varick Avenue to Bleecker Street and from Bleecker Street to Halsey Street went to the Oakdale Contracting Company.

Another delay occurred in November 1925 regarding the alignment of the 14th Street/Eastern Line along a three-block section from Cooper Street to Central Avenue, which was to parallel the Bay Ridge Branch. This section, near what is now the Wilson Avenue station, was to run between the LIRR tracks to the west and the Cemetery of the Evergreens and the Most Holy Trinity Cemetery to the east. This section would contain portals for the subway to rise to ground level on either side of the Wilson Avenue station, with space separating the LIRR and subway tracks. However, the LIRR said it needed the space for overhead electrification poles as a result of the Kaufman Act and that these poles would prevent the construction of the subway portals. In January 1926, the Oakdale Contracting Company submitted a low bid of $1,345,778 for the section from Halsey Street to Cooper Street.

On July 14, 1928, the line was extended further east beneath Wyckoff Avenue and then south paralleling the Bay Ridge Branch to a new station at Broadway Junction, above the existing station on the Broadway Elevated (Jamaica Line). At this time, it was connected to the Canarsie Line. At noon on May 30, 1931, a two-block extension to Eighth Avenue in Manhattan was opened, allowing passengers to transfer to the new IND Eighth Avenue Line. This station was built to look like the other Independent Subway stations. At this point, the Canarsie Line's route took the shape that it still has to this day.

Mid- to late 20th century 

Express service operated along the line along the local track, skipping all stops between Myrtle Avenue and Lorimer Street. This service pattern stopped in August 1956.

On November 23, 1942, the Canarsie Shuttle trolley line to Canarsie Landing was replaced by the B42 bus; the -long right-of-way was abandoned. Parts were built over, and other parts can still be seen as broad alleys or narrow parking lots. This right-of-way ran between East 95th and East 96th Streets as far south as Seaview Avenue. Some trolley poles from the line still exist, but the line's right-of-way was destroyed by developments in the area.

Early 21st century upgrades

Automation and post-automation 

Because of this, it was chosen as the location of the first fully automated line of the New York City Subway. The automation project was among the first in the world to use a radio frequency-based system. The plans for installation were laid out between 1999 and 2002. Communications-based train control (CBTC) was installed in pieces between 2003 and January 2006: the elevated section of the line south of Broadway Junction was completed first, followed by the underground section north of Broadway Junction. The project cost $340 million, with $78 million of it used to upgrade track interlockings on the line.

In spring 2005, the current CBTC-enabled R143-class equipment was expected to run under full automation with a single operator (known as OPTO, or One Person Train Operation) acting as an attendant to monitor the train's operation and take over manual operation if necessary. However, technical mishaps including the test train rolling away by itself delayed the start of automatic train operation. The project caused numerous service disruptions on the L at night and on weekends. Frequently, service was shut down in separate sections of the line, usually from Eighth Avenue to Lorimer Street, Lorimer to Broadway Junction, or Broadway Junction to Rockaway Parkway. During this time, shuttle buses served suspended areas. This project also required the temporary closing of some stations, either in one direction or both directions, and for the line to be operated in two sections.

In June 2005, the Canarsie Line ran full-length  trains with a single operator on weekends. However, as this was a violation of union contracts – which stipulated that there must be one operator per  of train – the MTA was ordered to resume two-person operation at all times.

The system became operational . Automation was achieved with the R143s assigned exclusively to the L, but since the R160As were not CBTC-compatible until August 2010, some trains were manually operated alongside automatically driven trains. The L fully began automatic train operation in early 2012. The CBTC installation increased the train capacity on the line from 20 trains per hour (tph) to 24 tph, as well as permitted the installation of countdown clocks, which show the amount of time until the next train arrives.

14th Street Tunnel shutdown 

In January 2016, the BMT Canarsie Line between Bedford and Eighth Avenues was proposed for a partial or full shutdown so that the MTA could repair tunnels damaged by Hurricane Sandy in 2012. The repairs are slated to start in April 2019 and would replace damaged communications, power and signal wires, third rails and tracks, duct banks, pump rooms, circuit breaker houses, tunnel lighting, concrete lining, and fire protection systems.

The renovations would cost between $800 million and $1 billion. There were two options: a partial closure for three years or a full closure for 18 months. It was later announced that the MTA had chosen the 18-month full closure option. To provide alternate service, the MTA devised preliminary mitigation plans in which it proposed adding shuttle bus, ferry, and subway service; adding bus and high-occupancy vehicle lanes; extending train routes; and providing free or improved transfers. The MTA named Judlau Contracting and TC Electric as the project's contractors on April 3, 2017. At this time, the duration of the shutdown was shortened to 15 months, so the shutdown would begin in April instead of in January. In June 2018, as part of a lawsuit settlement, additional changes were made to the shutdown mitigation plans.

The shutdown was expected to begin on April 27, 2019. In January 2019, the shutdown was changed to limited closures between Third Avenue and Bedford Avenue on late nights and weekends. It was expected to last about 15 to 20 months. On April 26, 2020, New York governor Andrew Cuomo announced the completion of the project, months ahead of schedule.

Service patterns 

Service patterns over this line have varied little through the years; initially, trains ran over the Broadway Elevated from the ferry in Williamsburg (later extended into Manhattan), through Manhattan Junction and on to Canarsie. Then when the subway opened, two services ran from Canarsie to Manhattan: the original route on the Broadway Elevated and the route to 14th Street as the 14th Street-Canarsie Line.

In 1936, due to the institution of new lightweight subway-elevated equipment, a new rush-hour-only service was inaugurated from Eighth Avenue and 14th Street to Lefferts Boulevard at the east end of the Liberty Avenue Elevated (the continuation of the Fulton Street Elevated). The Eighth Avenue–Canarsie route was given BMT marker 16, and trains running to Lefferts Boulevard usually were marked as 13. When the Fulton Street El was torn down, some rush-hour Broadway trains ran through from the Broadway Elevated (Jamaica Line) to Canarsie via the flyover at Broadway Junction; these were marked as 14. By 1967, when all BMT services had been given letters, the 16, which used the full Canarsie Line, was designated as LL. The rush-hour Broadway service (14) was designated JJ. The JJ ran until 1968 when it was replaced by the KK which stayed on the Jamaica Line instead of switching to the Canarsie Line at Broadway Junction. The flyover connection has not been used by any regular revenue service since then.

Skip-stop service proposal 

In 1991, skip-stop service was proposed in order to speed service during the height of rush hours in the peak direction which would have reduced the running time from 41 minutes to 37 minutes. Under this plan, the K designation, which was previously used as the Broadway Brooklyn Local from 1967 to 1976, and as the Eighth Avenue Local from 1985 to 1988, would be repurposed and would appear in a gray bullet similar to the color the L uses. Both services would have common stops at Rockaway Parkway, Broadway Junction (then called Eastern Parkway), Myrtle Avenue, Lorimer Street, First Avenue, Union Square, Sixth Avenue and Eighth Avenue. L trains would stop at East 105th Street, Livonia Avenue, Atlantic Avenue, Wilson Avenue, DeKalb Avenue, Morgan Avenue, Grand Street, and Bedford Avenue; K trains would stop at New Lots Avenue, Sutter Avenue, Bushwick Avenue–Aberdeen Street, Halsey Street, Jefferson Street, Montrose Avenue, Graham Avenue and Third Avenue. This change was proposed as a service improvement alongside other changes that would have either reduced or eliminated service in order to balance the MTA's operational budget, but was never implemented.

Chaining information 
The entire line is chained BMT Q. This has no relation whatsoever to lettered train service that operates on the line, which is designated L. The tracks on the line are labeled Q1 towards Canarsie and Q2 towards Manhattan.

Chaining zero is BMT Q, now located at the compass western end of the line at Eighth Avenue and 14th Street in Manhattan. The entire Canarsie Line is coextensive with chaining letter BMT Q and this chaining letter is used for no other line. Railroad north on this line is towards Manhattan, and corresponds roughly to a northwesterly to westerly compass direction.

2004 chaining revision 
Prior to 2004, the chaining on the Canarsie Line reflected its historic origin. The original elevated right-of-way from the point where it split with the old Fulton Street Elevated at Pitkin and Van Sinderen Avenues in 1906 was designated as BRT chaining line P, and chaining zero for that section was at the same location.

The portion of the 14th Street–Canarsie Line built or rehabilitated under the Dual Contracts and opened in 1924 and 1928 was designated BMT Q beginning at Sixth Avenue and 14th Street in Manhattan and extending to the beginning of BMT P chaining at Pitkin Avenue. Chaining zero for the BMT Q chaining line was also at Sixth Avenue.

When the line was extended to Eighth Avenue in 1931, chaining zero for the BMT Q chaining line was not moved. Rather than change all the signal designations and chaining stations on the line, the new section was extended west from the same zero and designated chaining line BMT QW.

When the installation of automated train operation required the complete replacement of the signal system, the MTA decided to make the entire line BMT Q and move chaining zero to the current compass western end of the line. Therefore, the chaining station of every location on the line had to be changed, a situation rarely seen since the Dual Contracts changes on the old BRT circa 1920.

Station listing

References

External links 

 
 Railroad History Database
 NYCsubway.org – BMT 14th Street-Canarsie Line (text used with permission)

Brooklyn–Manhattan Transit Corporation
New York City Subway lines